Delaware Township is a township in Delaware County, Iowa, USA.  As of the 2000 census, its population was 6,294.

Geography
Delaware Township covers an area of 36.64 square miles (94.89 square kilometers); of this, 0.19 square miles (0.5 square kilometers) or 0.53 percent is water. The streams of Coffins Creek, Honey Creek, Lindsey Creek and Rieger Creek run through this township.

Cities and towns
 Manchester (vast majority)

Unincorporated towns
 Dutchtown
 Orchard Lane Mobile Home Court
(This list is based on USGS data and may include former settlements.)

Adjacent townships
 Honey Creek Township (north)
 Elk Township (northeast)
 Oneida Township (east)
 Milo Township (south)
 Prairie Township (southwest)
 Coffins Grove Township (west)
 Richland Township (northwest)

Cemeteries
The township contains four cemeteries: Mead, Oakland, Rock Prairie and Saint Marys.

Major highways
 U.S. Route 20

References
 U.S. Board on Geographic Names (GNIS)
 United States Census Bureau cartographic boundary files

External links
 US-Counties.com
 City-Data.com

Townships in Delaware County, Iowa
Townships in Iowa